Uroporphyrinogen-III C-methyltransferase, uroporphyrinogen methyltransferase, uroporphyrinogen-III methyltransferase, adenosylmethionine-uroporphyrinogen III methyltransferase, S-adenosyl-L-methionine-dependent uroporphyrinogen III methylase, uroporphyrinogen-III methylase, SirA, CysG, CobA, uroporphyrin-III C-methyltransferase, S-adenosyl-L-methionine:uroporphyrin-III C-methyltransferase) is an enzyme with systematic name S-adenosyl-L-methionine:uroporphyrinogen-III C-methyltransferase. This enzyme catalyses the following chemical reaction

 2 S-adenosyl-L-methionine + uroporphyrinogen III  2 S-adenosyl-L-homocysteine + precorrin-2 (overall reaction)
(1a) S-adenosyl-L-methionine + uroporphyrinogen III  S-adenosyl-L-homocysteine + precorrin-1
(1b) S-adenosyl-L-methionine + precorrin-1  S-adenosyl-L-homocysteine + precorrin-2

Uroporphyrinogen-III C-methyltransferase catalyses two methylation reactions.  The first reaction converts uroporphyrinogen III into precorrin-1.  The second converts precorrin-1 into precorrin-2. These reactions are part of the biosynthetic pathway to cobalamin (vitamin B12) in both anaerobic and aerobic bacteria.

See also
 Cobalamin biosynthesis

References

External links 
 

EC 2.1.1